The Altınkaya Dam is a rock-fill dam for irrigation and hydro power purposes, located on the River Kızılırmak, 23 km south of Bafra and 35 km west of Samsun in northern Turkey. It feeds Lake of Derbent.

Having a dam volume of 15,920,000 m³, Altınkaya Dam was completed in 1988. It has a storage volume of 5,763 billion m³ in a reservoir area at normal water surface elevation of 118.31 km2.

Total power from the facility is 4 x 175 MW, for an installed capacity of 700 MW MW giving an annual electricity production of 1,632 GWh.

See also

Boyabat Dam - upstream
Derbent Dam - downstream

Notes

References
 

Dams completed in 1986
Hydroelectric power stations in Turkey
Dams in Samsun Province
Rock-filled dams
Dams on the Kızılırmak River
Kızılırmak